The Duddar mine is one of the largest lead and zinc mines in Pakistan.  The mine is located in western Pakistan in Balochistan. The mine has reserves amounting to 50 million tonnes of ore grading 3.2% lead and 8.6% zinc thus resulting 1.6 million tonnes of lead and 3.5 million tonnes of zinc.

References 

Mines in Pakistan
Lead and zinc mines in Pakistan
Mining in Balochistan, Pakistan